The 2009 Colorado State Rams football team  represented Colorado State University as member of the Mountain West Conference in the 2009 NCAA Division I FBS football season. They played their home games at Sonny Lubick Field at Hughes Stadium in Fort Collins, Colorado and were led by second-year coach Steve Fairchild. The Rams finished the season 3–9 overall and 0–8 in Mountain West play place last out of nine teams.

Schedule

References

Colorado State
Colorado State Rams football seasons
Colorado State Rams football